Ayez Uddin Ahmed was a Bangladeshi freedom fighter. He was awarded Bir Protik for his contribution to the Liberation War of Bangladesh.

Career
Ahmed joined East Pakistan Rifles in 1951. In 1971 he was appointed in Halisahar, Chittagong. After the declaration of independence of Bangladesh he decided to take part in the Liberation War of Bangladesh. He countered the attack from Pakistani battleship with 3 inch mortar on 26 March 1971.

After the fall of Karerhat, freedom fighters changed their place from south part of Shuvopur Bridge to north part of Shuvopur Bridge. Then they decided to attack again. He was injured in a battle against Pakistanis in Shuvopur on 12 May 1971.

Ahmed went to India after his injury for medical treatment. He joined battlefield in September. Then he took part in the battle of Utma BOP and other places.

Achievements and honours
Ahmed was awarded Bir Protik for his contribution to the Liberation War of Bangladesh. He retired from his job in 1984.

Death
Ahmed died on 21 October 2019.

References

2019 deaths
Recipients of the Bir Protik
People from Barisal District
People of the Bangladesh Liberation War
Year of birth missing
Mukti Bahini personnel